Adelaide of Guelders ( – 1218) was the daughter of Count Otto I of Guelders and his wife, Richardis, the daughter of Duke Otto I of Bavaria and Agnes of Loon. Also known as Adelaide of Bellich or Alice of Guelders.

In 1197 in Stavoren, she married Count William I of Holland.  They had five children:
 Floris IV (24 June 1210 in The Hague–19 July 1234 in Corbie, France), succeeded his father as Count of Holland
 Otto (d. 1249), Regent of Holland in 1238–1239, Bishop of Utrecht
 William (d. 1238), Regent of Holland in 1234–1238.
 Richarda (d. 1262)
 Ada (d. 1258), Abbess at Rijnsburg from 1239 until her death

Adelaide died in 1218, while her husband was away on the Fifth Crusade.  She was buried in Rijnsburg Abbey.

German countesses
Year of birth uncertain
1218 deaths
House of Wassenberg
Countesses of Holland
Place of birth unknown
Place of death unknown
Burials at Rijnsburg Abbey
12th-century women of the Holy Roman Empire
13th-century women of the Holy Roman Empire